Edivaldo Rojas Hermoza (born 17 November 1985), sometimes known as Bolívia, is a Bolivian footballer who plays for Club San José as a forward.

Club career
Born in Cuiabá, Mato Grosso, to a Brazilian father and a Bolivian mother, Bolívia started his career at Clube Atlético Paranaense, signing a five-year contract with the club in August 2003. He made his Série A debut on 18 August 2004, against Figueirense Futebol Clube as a substitute.

On 1 April 2005, Bolívia was loaned to Associação Ferroviária de Esportes until the end of the São Paulo State League third division season. On 19 May, he joined Figueirense Futebol Clube of the top flight until the end of the campaign; on 1 February 2006 the loan was extended until 31 December but in March, he was loaned to Rio Preto Esporte Clube in the São Paulo second level.

Bolívia returned to Atlético in June 2006, and on 1 August he left for Associação Atlética Caldense in a nine-month loan. He scored 11 goals in the Minas Gerais Cup, but only found the net once in the Minas Gerais State League. After his return, he signed a new contract running until 30 April 2010, but appeared rarely for the side, being loaned for the fifth and last time in December 2007, now to Guaratinguetá Futebol, helping the team finish first in the group stage of the 2008 edition of the São Paulo State League and scoring once.

In July 2008, Bolívia was signed by Portuguese club Associação Naval 1º de Maio. In 2010–11, whilst changing his shirt name from Bolívia to Edivaldo – his given name was also spelled Edvaldo (without i) in some official documents – he only missed one game and netted four times, but the Figueira da Foz side were relegated from the Primeira Liga after six years.

After a brief spell in Asia with Muangthong United F.C. and Shonan Bellmare, Bolívia returned to the Portuguese top tier on 20 June 2014 by agreeing to a one-year deal with newly promoted Moreirense FC. He moved back to his country shortly after, going on to represent C.D. Jorge Wilstermann, Sport Boys Warnes and Club San José and winning the 2016 Clausura tournament with Wilstermann.

International career
In April 2011, Edivaldo received a call-up from the Bolivia national team, being made eligible shortly after all the documentation issues had been resolved. He made his debut on 4 June against Paraguay, in the first leg of the year's Copa Paz del Chaco played in Santa Cruz de la Sierra (0–2 loss), and also appeared in the second match three days later (0–0).
 
Edivaldo scored the opening goal of the 2011 Copa América, in a 1–1 draw against hosts Argentina. He represented his country in four FIFA World Cup qualification matches.

International goals

Honours
Muangthong United
Thai Premier League: 2012

Jorge Wilstermann
Liga de Fútbol Profesional Boliviano: Clausura 2016

References

External links

Futpédia profile  (Profile 2)

1985 births
Living people
People from Cuiabá
People with acquired Bolivian citizenship
Bolivian people of Brazilian descent
Brazilian people of Bolivian descent
Brazilian footballers
Bolivian footballers
Association football forwards
Campeonato Brasileiro Série A players
Club Athletico Paranaense players
Associação Ferroviária de Esportes players
Figueirense FC players
Rio Preto Esporte Clube players
Associação Atlética Caldense players
Guaratinguetá Futebol players
Primeira Liga players
Liga Portugal 2 players
Associação Naval 1º de Maio players
Moreirense F.C. players
Edivaldo Hermoza
Edivaldo Hermoza
J1 League players
Shonan Bellmare players
Bolivian Primera División players
C.D. Jorge Wilstermann players
Sport Boys Warnes players
Club San José players
Bolivia international footballers
2011 Copa América players
Brazilian expatriate footballers
Bolivian expatriate footballers
Expatriate footballers in Portugal
Expatriate footballers in Thailand
Expatriate footballers in Japan
Bolivian expatriate sportspeople in Portugal
Bolivian expatriate sportspeople in Japan
Bolivian expatriate sportspeople in Thailand
Sportspeople from Mato Grosso